The 4 Nations Cup is an annual women's ice hockey tournament, held between four major national teams in the sport; currently, these are Canada, the United States, Sweden and Finland. Until 2000, when Sweden joined, the tournament was the 3 Nations Cup. In general, it is held in or around November each year.

History
The 3 Nations Cup was first held in 1996. Sweden joined the tourney in 2000, but the USA did not attend the 2001 event due to the September 11 attacks; the 4 Nations roster has been constant since 2002.

The format of the tournament is a single round-robin, with each team playing one game against each of the others. The top two teams advance to the gold-medal game. The last two teams play for bronze. When it was the 3 Nations Cup, the third place team was simply awarded bronze. Team Canada has won 14 gold medals since the 4 Nations Cup creation in 1996 and Team USA has won 9 gold medals.

Medal table

Tournaments
Key
 Number of tournaments (or 2nd, 3rd, or 4th places) won at the time.

Year by Year

2006

The Tournament takes place in Kitchener, Ontario, Canada from 7  to 11 November 2006.

First Round
 Sweden 8–3 Finland
 Canada 3–0 USA
 USA 5–2 Finland
 Canada 7–0 Sweden
 USA 7–0 Sweden
 Canada 8-1 Finland

Standing
 Canada, 8 points
 United States, 4 points
 Sweden, 4 points
 Finland, 0points

Game for 3rd place 
 Sweden  3–2 Finland

 Game for the First place 
 Canada 5–2 USA

2007 

The tournament takes place November 7 to 11 on the ice rink of Ejendals Arena in Sweden.

Standing
 Canada, 6 points.
 United States, 4 points
 Finland, 2 points
 Sweden, 0 point

Sunday November 11, 2007
Game for the 3rd place
Finland 1 – 0 Sweden

Game for the first place
 United States 0 – 2 Canada

2008 

The tournament took place in November at Lake Placid USA.

First Round

Tuesday November 4, 2008
Canada 6–0 Finland
United States 5–2 Sweden

Wednesday November 5, 2008
Sweden 2–3 Finland

Thursday November 6, 2008
United States 2–4 Canada

Friday November 7, 2008
Canada 1–2 Sweden (after overtime period)
USA 4–1 Finland

Standing
 Canada, 5 points
 United States, 4 points
 Finland, 2 points
 Sweden, 2 points

Saturday November 9, 2008
Game for 3rd place
Sweden 1–0 Finland

Game for first place
USA 3–2 Canada after overtime period
Game was tied 2-2 after regulation and extra time. Erica McKenzie scored the game-winning goal for the United States team in the shootout.

2009

November 3, 4, 6 and 7 at Vierumäki in Finland.

First Round
 Tuesday November 3, 2009
Finland 0 - 4 United States 
Sweden 0 - 4 Canada

 Wednesday November 4, 2009
Finland 2 - 4  Canada
United States 3 - 2 Sweden

 Friday November 6, 2009
Finland 1 - 2 Sweden  (extra-time)
Canada 2 - 3  United States

Standing
 United States, 6 points
 Canada, 4 points
 Sweden, 2 points
 Finland, 0 point

Saturday November 7, 2009
Game for 3rd place
Finland 1 - 2 Sweden  (Extra-time)

Game for the First place
 Canada 5–2  United Stades.

2010

The tournament takes place from November 9 to the 13th in Clarenville, Newfoundland and St. John's, Newfoundland (Canada).

First Round

Tuesday November 9, 2010
 Finland 3–0 Sweden
USA 3–2 Canada (in Shootout).

Wednesday November 10, 2010
Canada 8–1 Sweden
 USA 4–0 Finland.

Friday November 12, 2010
Canada  15–0 Finland
USA  4–0 Sweden. Goaltender Jessie Vetter  makes 20 stops to earn the shutout.

Standing
1-USA, 6 points
2-Canada, 4 points
3-Finland, 2 points
4-Sweden, 0 points

Saturday November 13th 2010
Game for 3rd place
 Finland  2–1  Sweden

Game for the First place
Canada  3–2 USA.
Rebecca Johnston's goal in extra time period.

2011 

The tournament took place from November 9–14, 2011 to Nyköping in Sweden. The competition sets four powers of the Women's ice hockey, Canada, the United States Finland and Sweden. All the matches are played Stora Hallen arena.

First round
 Wednesday November 9, 2011
Canada  5 - 0 Finland
 Sweden 0 - 8 United States 

Thursday November 10, 2011
Canada  3 -1 United States
Sweden 1 - 2 Finland 

Saturday November 12, 2011
Sweden 1 - 3 Canada 
Finland 0 - 10 United States 

Standing
 Canada, 6 points
 United States, 4 points
 Finland, 2 points
 Sweden, 0

Sunday November 13, 2011
Game for 3rd place
Sweden  2 - 1 Finland

Game for the First place
United States  4 - 3 Canada.
After being tied 3–3 at the end of regulation and overtime, a shootout determined the winner. The United States' Goaltender Jessie Vetter gave the Americans the victory by stopping Canada's Hayley Wickenheiser.

References

External links
 2006 4 Nations Cup (Hockey Canada)
 3/4 Nations Cup at the Women's Hockey Net

 
Women's ice hockey tournaments